Nillup is a small townsite located in the South West region of Western Australia in the Shire of Augusta-Margaret River. Nillup was named by reversing the last name of Harold Maughan Pullin, a popular local who did not want the place named after him.

References 

Towns in Western Australia
South West (Western Australia)